Kevin Bradshaw (born February 13, 1965) is an American former professional basketball player and college basketball coach.  He is best known as the NCAA record-holder for most points in a single game against a Division I opponent.

College career
Bradshaw, a 6'6" guard, played high school basketball at Buchholz High School in Gainesville, Florida.  Playing alongside future NBA player Vernon Maxwell, Bradshaw averaged 30.6 points per game as a senior in 1983 and was named first team All-State.

Bradshaw turned down his hometown Florida Gators, instead opting to play for the smaller Bethune–Cookman University. After his sophomore season, he left the school and joined the Navy.  After being stationed on a submarine tender near San Diego, Bradshaw began playing with the All-Navy team. He would go on to travel the country playing with the Navy All Stars and later the All-Armed Forces team, alongside future NBA star David Robinson. After getting permission from the Navy to once again pursue his education, Bradshaw was recruited by Gary Zarecky, head coach of the Gulls of U.S. International University, who saw a great fit for his team's fast-paced style of play.  It was the perfect match of player and system, as Bradshaw went on to lead the NCAA in scoring as a senior in 1990–91 at 37.6 points per game.

On January 5, 1991, Bradshaw made NCAA history as he scored 72 points for the Gulls in a 186–140 loss to Loyola Marymount University – a meeting of two teams specializing in that fast-break style of play.  This performance broke Pete Maravich's NCAA record for most points scored against a Division I opponent.  The previous record had been 69 points, set by Maravich in a 1970 game against Alabama.

Bradshaw ended his college career with 2,804 points – currently #16 on the all-time NCAA career scoring list.

College statistics

Post-college
After failing to catch on with the NBA, Bradshaw played professionally in Israel for eleven years. He set numerous offensive records there, including once scoring 101 points in a game. After his playing career was over he became the first African-American coach in Israeli professional basketball history, guiding Hapoel Eilat to a 58–39 record in three years with the team. In 2008, he returned to the US and spent two years as an assistant coach at NAIA school Point Loma Nazarene University in San Diego, California. He became a teacher and coach at an inner-city high school (King-Chavez) in San Diego, while running "Be the Best" basketball camps, which tours nationwide and internationally in Israel, providing instruction for children of all ages.

See also
List of basketball players who have scored 100 points in a single game
List of NCAA Division I men's basketball players with 60 or more points in a game
List of NCAA Division I men's basketball season scoring leaders

References

External links
 Life of Kevin Bradshaw: Feature Article
 Coach Kevin Bradshaw Shooting Clinic

1965 births
Living people
African-American basketball players
American expatriate basketball people in Israel
American men's basketball players
Basketball coaches from Florida
Basketball players from Gainesville, Florida
Bethune–Cookman Wildcats men's basketball players
Buchholz High School alumni
Hapoel Tel Aviv B.C. players
Maccabi Ashdod B.C. players
Maccabi Haifa B.C. players
Point Loma Nazarene Sea Lions men's basketball coaches
Shooting guards
Sportspeople from Gainesville, Florida
United States International Gulls men's basketball players
21st-century African-American people
20th-century African-American sportspeople